Yuval Wagner is an Israeli Air Force combat pilot who was injured in a helicopter crash in 1987. It left him paralysed and he was reliant on a wheelchair. He realised the lack of accessibility in Israel for people with disabilities, and started Access Israel, a non-profit organization, in 1999. It works for accessibility to people with disabilities.

Achievements 
Wagner won the Globes' Social Entrepreneurial Award in 2006, and a Rick Hansen Foundation Difference Maker Award in 2011. He also received the Henry Viscardi Achievement Awards given to leaders in disability sector.

References 

Year of birth missing (living people)
Living people
Israeli disability rights activists
Survivors of aviation accidents or incidents
Israeli Air Force personnel
Wheelchair users